Admiral Power may refer to:

Arthur Power (1889–1960), British Royal Navy admiral
Arthur Mackenzie Power (1921–1984), British Royal Navy vice admiral 
Manley Laurence Power (1904–1981), British Royal Navy admiral